GoEast, styled goEast, is an international film festival which has been held annually in the Hessian state capital of Wiesbaden, Germany, since its inception in 2001. The festival is primarily for films with an Eastern European background, and is held by the Deutsches Filminstitut (German Film Institute) for one week every April.

History
The goEast film festival, launched in 2001, was founded by Claudia Dillmann, the Director of the German Film Institute – DIF. Likewise involved in developing the original festival concept was Swetlana Sikora, who has remained the festival's Artist Director until 2010. "The time has come to open ourselves to the thoughts, images, myths and stories of our Eastern neighbours. To their culture. To their films.", wrote Claudia Dillmann in her foreword to the first festival catalogue.

From the beginning, the state capital Wiesbaden and the  state government of Hesse has given substantial support to the festival, as it made its home in the Caligari cinemas. Hilmar Hoffmann became patron of the festival.

In late summer 2010 Gaby Babic took over the post of Festival Director, and for the first time a combined role as Artistic Director as well. After Claudia Dillmann, Christine Kopf and Nadja Rademacher she is the fourth front woman of goEast.

The 2021 festival took place in April, mainly online, as well as in the cities of Frankfurt, Darmstadt and Giessen.

Directors and stars who have been guests at the festival includes Krzysztof Zanussi, Jiří Menzel, István Szabó, Hanna Schygulla, Béla Tarr, Jerzy Stuhr, Kira Muratova, Otar Iosseliani, Maria Schrader, Joachim Król, Sergei Loznitsa, Bohdan Sláma, Cristi Puiu and many more.

Sections

Competition
Ten feature films and six documentaries are nominated for the goEast Competition. Eligibility is restricted to productions completed within the past two years in the applicable countries; in addition, since 2008 documentaries made in Germany or Israel may be nominated if they possess clear thematic relevance to Central and Eastern Europe.

Symposium
The annual goeast symposiUm invites (film) scholars, historians and specialists to examine socially relevant topics within the context of historical artistic developments. This section is built around interdisciplinary debate encompassing a range of aesthetic and theoretical perspectives, and is accompanied by a separately curated series of films. All lectures, discussions and screenings are open to the general public.

Young Professionals Programme
The goeast Students' Competition presents work by young filmmakers from East and West. The BHF-BANK Foundation finances three audience prizes worth 1,000 EUR respectively as well as an adjudicated supporting prize (1,500 EUR) for the best short film from an Eastern European film school. Since 2007, goEast has hosted the presentation of the Co-Production award of the Robert Bosch Stiftung, which offers support to three projects involving the cooperation of young filmmakers from Eastern and Southeastern Europe as well as from Germany. Awarded in cooperation with ARTE, a grant of up to 70,000 EUR goes to one outstanding project proposal in each of the three categories Documentary, Animation, and Short Film. With a week-long programme geared towards exchange of experience and provision of support for joint proposals, the annual Project Market
fosters networking among young filmmakers from Eastern Europe and Germany. The workshops and discussions held during the goeast Young Professionals programme allow upcoming filmmakers to profit from the experience of renowned commissioning editors, producers and directors.

Homage/Portrait
Dedicated to Otar Iosseliani, Kira Muratova or Sergei Parajanov one year, to Jan Svěrák, Benedek Fliegauf or Fatmir Koci the next – this alternating festival slot pays tribute to the achievements of established masters or highlights the inspiring careers of contemporary filmmakers or actors.

Beyond Belonging
Beyond Belonging is open to productions from countries outside Central and Eastern Europe but bearing a clear relation to the region.

Highlights
This section presents hand-picked highlights of Central and Eastern European mainstream cinema.

Specials
Special events include film archives, school film days, concerts and closing parties.

Awards
An international jury chooses the recipients of the Škoda Prize (10,000 EUR) – the “Golden Lily” – for Best Film, the "Remembrance and Future" documentary prize (10,000 EUR), the prize for Best Director (7,500 EUR) from the City of Wiesbaden, and the prize (2,000 EUR) from the Federal Foreign Office of Germany. A jury dispatched by FIPRESCI awards the International Film Critics' Prize.

Award Winners

ŠKODA Film Award (prize name changed in 2013)
 2013 - In Bloom By Nana Ekvtimishvili and Simon Groß

The ŠKODA Award "The Golden Lily" for Best Film 
 2012 - Living By Vassily Sigarev
 2011 - A Stoker By Alexei Balabanov
 2010 - Street Days By Levan Koguashvili
 2009 - The Other Bank By George Ovashvili
 2008 - Magnus By Kadri Kõusaar
 2007 - Euphoria By Ivan Vyrypaev
 2006 - Tbilisi-tbilisi By Levan Zakarejšvili
 2005 - The Tuner By Kira Muratova
 2004 - Roads To Koktebel By Boris Khlebnikov and Aleksei Popogrebski
 2003 - The Key Determining Dwarfs, Or The Last Travel Of Lemuel Gulliver By Martin Šulík
 2002 - Hi, Tereska By Robert Gliński
 2001 - The Big Animal By Jerzy Stuhr and Second Class-people By Kira Muratova

Award For Best Director Donated By The City Of Wiesbaden 
 2013 - Circles By Srdan Golubović
 2012 - AVÉ By Konstantin Bojanov
 2011 - Morgen By Marian Crişan
 2010 - Days Of Desire By József Pacskovszky
 2009 - Help Gone Mad By Boris Khlebnikov
 2008 - Love And Other Crimes By Stefan Arsenijević
 2007 - The Trap By Srdan Golubović
 2006 - Garpastum By Aleksei German Jr.
 2005 - Stranger By Małgorzata Szumowska
 2004 - Dealer By Benedek Fliegauf
 2003 - Ballroom Dancing By Lívia Gyarmathy
 2002 - The Last Supper By Vojka Anzeljc
 2001 - Passport By Péter Gothár

Documentary Award – “remembrance And Future” Of The Foundation Evz (since 2008) 
 2013 - Anton's right here By Lyubov Arkus
 2012 - Revision By Philip Scheffner
 2011 - The Last Day Of Summer By Piotr Stasik
 2010 - OJ Mama Von orna Ben Dor By Noa Maiman
 2009 - I Love Poland By joanna Sławińska And Maria Zmarz-koczanowicz
 2008 - The Flower Bridge By Thomas Ciulei

Documentary Award By The Hertie Foundation (until 2007) 
 2007 - How To Do It By Marcel Łoziński
 2006 - Facing The Day By Ivona Juka
 2005 - Pretty Dyana By Boris Mitić
 2004 - Alphabet Of Hope By Stephan Komandarev
 2003 - Bread Over The Fence By Stephan Komandarev
 2002 - Joy Of Life By Svetozar Ristovski

Award Of The Federal Foreign Office For “artistic Originality Which Creates Cultural Diversity” 
 2013 - Celestial Wives of the Meadow Mari By Aleksey Fedorchenko
 2012 - Mother’s Paradise By Aktan Arym Kubat
 2011 - Gorelovka By Alexander Kviria
 2010 - How I Ended This Summer By Alexei Popogrebski
 2009 - Morphia By Alexei Balabanov
 2008 - At The River By Eva Nejman
 2007 - Armin By Ognjen Sviličić
 2006 - Death Rode Out Of Persia By Putyi Horváth

References

External links
  

Film festivals in Germany
Culture in Wiesbaden
Mass media in Wiesbaden